Michael Johan Runge (12 June 1924 – 4 August 2005) was a Danish weightlifter. Competing as featherweight he won the European title in 1949 and 1951; placing second at the world championships in both years. Runge finished seventh at the 1948 and 1952 Summer Olympics.

References

External links
 

1924 births
2005 deaths
Danish male weightlifters
Olympic weightlifters of Denmark
Weightlifters at the 1948 Summer Olympics
Weightlifters at the 1952 Summer Olympics
People from Kongens Lyngby
World Weightlifting Championships medalists
Sportspeople from the Capital Region of Denmark